Municipal annexation is a process by which a municipality expands its boundaries into nearby, usually adjacent, unincorporated areas. This has been a common response of cities to urbanization in neighboring areas. It may be done because the neighboring urban areas seek municipal services or because a city seeks control over its suburbs or neighboring unincorporated areas.

In the United States, all local governments are considered "creatures of the state" according to Dillon's Rule, which resulted from the work of John Forrest Dillon on the law of municipal corporations. Dillon's Rule implies, among other things, that the boundaries of any jurisdiction falling under state government can be modified by state government action. For this reason, examples of municipal annexation are distinct from annexations involving sovereign states.

Shoestring annexation

A "shoestring annexation" is a term used for an annexation by a city, town or other municipality in which it acquires new territory that is contiguous to the existing territory but is only connected to it by a thin strip of land. It is sometimes called a "flagpole annexation" because the territory resembles a flagpole, in which the connection is the "pole" and the annexed territory the "flag".

Reasons
In some states, municipalities are prohibited from annexing land not directly connected to their existing territory.  A shoestring or flagpole annexation allows the municipality to do so.

Such annexations are sometimes used when a municipality seeks to acquire unincorporated developed land, such as a newly built subdivision separated from it by undeveloped open space. They may also be used when a municipality desires to annex a commercial or industrial area without taking over intervening residential areas, so as to collect tax revenues from the businesses or industry without having to provide services (such as electricity and garbage collection) to residents. Such uses of the technique are often criticized and derided as a form of gerrymandering, and have in fact been used for the purpose of manipulating vote distribution among election precincts and districts.

A related strategy is called strip annexation, which involves annexing a narrow strip that encloses a large block of unincorporated land. Strip annexation was widely used by the municipalities of the Phoenix metropolitan area during the 1970s to preemptively gain control of large areas of land before other municipalities, without having to annex more than a thin strip surrounding a large so-called county island. The strip protected the county island from being annexed by other municipalities, thus giving the strip-annexing municipality the ability to slowly annex portions of the county island over time. One such annexation by Chandler in 1974 spurred nearby Gilbert to create the largest county island to date by annexing a strip no more than 200 feet wide that enclosed 51 square miles of unincorporated Maricopa County. The annexation was challenged in court and, although found legal, eventually led to legislation in 1980 outlawing strip annexation. Some municipalities rushed to annex before the law took effect, such as Scottsdale, which annexed a 10 foot wide strip enclosing an 86 square mile county island.

Examples

Port of Los Angeles
The Port of Los Angeles together with the San Pedro, Wilmington and Harbor City neighborhoods of Los Angeles, are connected to the main part of the city by what is called locally the "Shoestring Strip" between Figueroa Street and Vermont Avenue and between Western and Normandie avenues to the south.

O'Hare Airport
O'Hare Airport is municipally connected to the city of Chicago via a narrow strip of land, approximately 200 feet wide, along Foster Avenue from the Des Plaines river to the airport. This land was annexed in the 1950s to assure the airport was contiguous with the city to keep it under city control.  The strip is bounded on the north by Rosemont and the south by Schiller Park.

Allston-Brighton
The Boston neighborhoods of Allston and Brighton were part of an independent town of Brighton before being annexed by Boston.  They are presently connected to the remainder of the city by the Boston University campus. At the time of the annexation, Brookline extended to the Charles River and separated Boston and Brighton.  As a result, a shoestring annexation was obtained by Boston from Brookline when Brighton joined Boston.  This was made necessary by Brookline's refusal to join Boston a year before Brighton's annexation.

South San Diego
South San Diego, located next to the Mexico–United States border, is physically separated from the rest of San Diego by the cities of National City and Chula Vista. A narrow strip of land at the bottom of San Diego Bay connects these southern neighborhoods with the rest of the city.

West Grove
West Grove, the western portion of the city of Garden Grove in Orange County, California, is separated from the rest of the city by the city of Stanton. The two portions of the city are connected to the rest of the city by a narrow strip of land along Garden Grove Boulevard from Beach Boulevard to Hoover Street.

See also
 Municipal annexation
 Amalgamation (politics)
 Enclave and exclave
 Boroughitis
 Paper township

References
Notes

Further reading

Staff. MRSC PUBLICATIONS › Annexation Handbook Publication, Municipal Research & Services Center of Washington.

Annexation
Political geography
Metropolitan areas of the United States
Urban planning
Local government in the United States